Robert James Rogers, Baron Lisvane,  (born 5 February 1950) is a British life peer and retired public servant. He served as Clerk of the House of Commons from October 2011 until August 2014.

Following his elevation as a Life Peer in 2014, Lord Lisvane sits as a crossbencher in the House of Lords.

He is also a member of the Steering Committee of the Constitution Reform Group (CRG), a cross-party organisation which is chaired by Robert Gascoyne-Cecil, 7th Marquess of Salisbury which seeks a new constitutional settlement in the UK by way of a new Act of Union. Lord Lisvane introduced the Act of Union Bill 2018 as a private member’s bill in the House of Lords on 9 October 2018, when it received a formal first reading. The BBC has suggested that the issues addressed by the Bill are likely to become important in the 2019 Parliament.

Early life
Born in Cardiff, Rogers attended Tonbridge School before going to Lincoln College, Oxford, where he read for the degree Anglo-Saxon, Norse and Celtic, as well as representing Oxford University at cricket, hockey, and real tennis. He captained Lincoln College in the series of University Challenge broadcast in 1970, reaching the semi-final.

He was a Rhodes Research Scholar in 1971 and worked briefly at the Ministry of Defence before entering parliamentary service in the House of Commons.

Parliament career

House of Commons
Rogers joined the House of Commons Service in 1972 and was involved in every aspect of the procedural and committee work of Parliament during his career, including postings as Clerk for Private Members' Bills, Clerk to the Defence Select Committee, Clerk of the European Scrutiny Committee, Secretary of the House of Commons Commission, Clerk of Select Committees, Clerk of the Journals (2004–2005), Principal Clerk of the Table Office (2005–2006), and Clerk of Legislation (2006–2009). He was Clerk Assistant and Director General, Chamber and Committee Services from 2009 to 2011. He succeeded Sir Malcolm Jack as Clerk of the House of Commons on 1 October 2011.
 
On 30 April 2014, Rogers announced his intention to retire at the end of August that year. At the date of his retirement he had served for over four decades in the House of Commons, including more than ten years as a Clerk at the Table.

House of Lords
On 21 October 2014, it was announced that Rogers was to be raised to the peerage, having been nominated personally by Prime Minister David Cameron. He was created a life peer on 11 December 2014, taking the title Lord Lisvane, of Blakemere in the County of Herefordshire and of Lisvane in the City and County of Cardiff.

Lord Lisvane sits in the House of Lords as a crossbencher. He made his maiden speech on 1 June 2015. He is a member of the House of Lords Committee on Delegated Powers and Regulatory Reform, and of the Ecclesiastical Committee. He is an independent vice-president of the Local Government Association.

Personal life and other posts
Rogers has been independent chairman of local government standards committees, a police authority and a fire and rescue authority. He was Chairman of the Hereford Cathedral Perpetual Trust and a member of the Cathedral Council (2007–09). In 2016 Lord Lisvane undertook an independent review to examine the functioning of the branches of Tynwald, the Isle of Man parliament, and to consider options for reform.

On 22 January 2020, Lord Lisvane submitted a formal complaint to the Parliamentary Commissioner for Standards against former Commons Speaker John Bercow.

He is co-author of the standard textbook How Parliament Works, as of 2018 in its eight edition, and author of two parliamentary miscellanies: Order! Order! (2010) and Who Goes Home? (2012).

He is married to Jane, who was ordained as a deacon in the Church of England on 30 June 2013 and as a priest on 27 September 2014; they have two daughters: Catherine, a solicitor, and Eleanor, who works in public health research. Jane was the High Sheriff of Herefordshire 2017–18.

Lisvane's recreations are sailing, shooting, cricket, music (he is a church organist) and country pursuits.

Honours
Rogers was appointed Knight Commander of the Order of the Bath (KCB) in the 2013 New Year Honours for "parliamentary and public service". He was appointed a Deputy Lieutenant for Herefordshire in April 2015.

Rogers was elected to an honorary fellowship of Lincoln College, Oxford, in 2012, and as an honorary bencher of the Middle Temple in 2013. He is also a Freeman of the City of London, a liveryman and Past Master of the Skinners' Company. In October 2016, he was appointed to the ancient office of Chief Steward of the City of Hereford.

References

External links
 People of Today - Robert Rogers Debretts

1950 births
Living people
People educated at Tonbridge School
People from Cardiff
Alumni of Lincoln College, Oxford
Clerks of the House of Commons
Crossbench life peers
Deputy Lieutenants of Herefordshire
Knights Commander of the Order of the Bath
Contestants on University Challenge
English educators
Life peers created by Elizabeth II
English organists